Bulgaria competed at the 1998 Winter Olympics in Nagano, Japan. Bulgaria won its first ever Gold Medal when Ekaterina Dafovska won the Women's 15 km Biathlon.

Medalists

Alpine skiing

Men

Men's combined

Women

Biathlon

Men

Women

Women's 4 × 7.5 km relay

 1 A penalty loop of 150 metres had to be skied per missed target.
 2 One minute added per missed target.

Cross-country skiing

Men

 1 Starting delay based on 10 km results. 
 C = Classical style, F = Freestyle

Women

 2 Starting delay based on 5 km results. 
 C = Classical style, F = Freestyle

Figure skating

Men

Women

Ice Dancing

Short track speed skating

Women

Snowboarding

Women's giant slalom

References
Official Olympic Reports
International Olympic Committee results database
 Olympic Winter Games 1998, full results by sports-reference.com

Nations at the 1998 Winter Olympics
1998